Josue (or Josué) is a name, a variant of the name Joshua. It may refer to:

Given name
 Josué Dubois Berthelot de Beaucours (1662-1750), French military officer
 Athanase Josué Coquerel (1820-1875), French Protestant theologian
 Josue Dupon (1864-1935), Belgian sculptor
 Josué Smith Solar (1867-1938), Chilean architect
 Josué Francisco Trocado (1882-1962), Portuguese composer
 Josué Jéhouda (1892-1966), Swiss Zionist writer and journalist
 Josué de Castro (1908-1973), Brazilian physician
 Josué Santos (1916-2007), Mexican basketball player
 Josué Bengtson (born 1944), Brazilian politician and pastor
 Josué Sánchez (born 1945), Peruvian painter
 Josue Marquez (1946-2018), Puerto Rican boxer
 Josué Modesto dos Passos Subrinho (born 1956), Brazilian economics professor
 Josué Teixeira (born 1960), Brazilian football manager
 Josué Blocus (born 1969), French heavyweight boxer
 Josué Camacho (born 1969), Puerto Rican boxer
 Josué & Trópico Suemba (born 1969), Mexican singer-songwriter
 Josué Guébo (born 1972), Ivorian academic
 Josué Valdés Huezo (born 1975), Mexican politician
 Josué Méndez (born 1976), Peruvian film director
 Josué Carrión (born 1978), Puerto Rican businessman
 Josué Matos (born 1978), Puerto Rican baseball player
 Josué (footballer, born 1979), Josué Anunciado de Oliveira, Brazilian football defensive midfielder
 Josué Mayard (born 1980), Haitian football defender
 Josué Castillejos (born 1981), Mexican football midfielder
 Josue Deprez (born 1981), Haitian judoka
 Josué Galdámez (born 1982), Salvadoran football midfielder
 Josué Cajuste (born 1984), Haitian Paralympics athlete
 Josue (footballer, born 1987), Josue Souza Santos, Brazilian football striker
 Josué Flores (born 1988), Salvadoran football midfielder
 Josué Ayala (born 1988), Argentine football goalkeeper
 Juan Josué Rodríguez (born 1988), Honduran football attacking midfielder
 Josué González (born 1988), Costa Rican cyclist
 Josue Paul (born 1988), American gridiron football wide receiver
 Josué Mitchell (born 1989), Costa Rican football forward
 Paulo Josué (born 1989), Brazilian football midfielder
 Josue Soto (born 1989), American soccer midfielder
 Josué Balamandji (born 1989), Central African Republic football striker
 Josué Pesqueira (born 1990), Portuguese football attacking midfielder
 Josué Martínez (born 1990), Costa Rican football forward
 Josué Quijano (born 1991), Nicaraguan football defender
 Josué Albert (born 1992), French Guianan football defender
 Josué Sá (born 1992), Portuguese football centre-back
 Josué Bustos (born 1992), Mexican football forward
 Josué Brachi (born 1992), Spanish weightlifter
 Josue Matías (born 1993), Dominican gridiron football guard
 Josué Dorrio (born 1994), Spanish football winger
 Josué Enríquez (born 1994), Guatemalan squash player
 Josue España (born 1995), American soccer midfielder
 Josué Soto (born 1995), American soccer defender
 Josué Domínguez (born 1996), Dominican swimmer
 Josué Lázaro (born 1996), Mexican football midfielder
 Josué Reyes (born 1997), Mexican football centre-back
 Josué Gaxiola (born 1997), Mexican beach volleyball player
 Josué Homawoo (born 1997), Togolese football defender
 Josué Colmán (born 1998), Paraguayan football attacking midfielder
 Josue Monge (born 1999), Costa Rican football midfielder
 Josué Villafranca (born 1999), Honduran football forward
 Josué (Angolan footballer) (born 2000), Eduardo João Bunga, Angolan football goalkeeper
 Josué Abarca (born 2000), Costa Rican winger
 Josué Duverger (born 2000), Haitian football goalkeeper
 Josué Casimir (born 2001), Guadeloupean football forward
 Josué Doké (born 2004), Togolese football forward
 Josue Cruz Jr. (fl. 2005-2007), American professor
 Josué Galindo (born 2006), Honduran football midfielder
 Josue Larose (fl. 2008-present), American political organizer
 Josué Alex Mukendi (fl. 2011), Congolese politician
 Josué Augusto Durán (fl. 2019), Ecuadorian writer
 Josue Ortega, British economic lecturer

Surname
 Bulambo Lembelembe Josué (born 1960), Congolese Christian minister
 Steve Josue (born 1980), American gridiron football linebacker

See also
 Joshua (disambiguation)